Hibiscus vitifolius, the grape-leaved mallow or tropical rose mallow, is a species of flowering plant in the family Malvaceae. It is native to the seasonally dry Old World tropics and subtropics, and has been introduced to most of the islands of the Caribbean. A perennial herb reaching  and becoming woody at maturity, it is found in a wide variety of habitats, and is a weed of cultivation. It is used locally as a source of fiber, often mixed with jute.

Subtaxa
The following subspecies are accepted:
Hibiscus vitifolius subsp. lukei  – central Kenya
Hibiscus vitifolius subsp. vitifolius – entire range

References

vitifolius
Flora of West Tropical Africa
Flora of West-Central Tropical Africa
Flora of Northeast Tropical Africa
Flora of East Tropical Africa
Flora of South Tropical Africa
Flora of Southern Africa
Flora of the Comoros
Flora of the Arabian Peninsula
Flora of the Indian subcontinent
Flora of Indo-China
Flora of Christmas Island
Flora of Java
Flora of the Lesser Sunda Islands
Flora of Sulawesi
Flora of New Guinea
Flora of Western Australia
Flora of the Northern Territory
Flora of Queensland
Taxa named by Carl Linnaeus
Plants described in 1753